Lemyra rhodophila is a moth of the family Erebidae. It was described by Francis Walker in 1864. It is found in China (Tibet), Pakistan, India (Himachal Pradesh, Sikkim), Myanmar and Nepal.

References

 

rhodophila
Moths described in 1864